Adam Johann von Krusenstern (also Krusenstjerna in Swedish; , tr. ; 10 October 177012 August 1846) was a Russian admiral and explorer, who led the first Russian circumnavigation of the globe.

Life 

Krusenstern was born in Haggud, Kreis Harrien, Governorate of Estonia, Russian Empire into a Baltic German family descended from the Swedish aristocratic family von Krusenstjerna, who remained in the province after the country was ceded to Russia. In 1787, he joined the Russian Imperial Navy, and served in the war against Sweden. Subsequently, he served in the Royal Navy between 1793 and 1799, visiting America, India and China.

After publishing a paper pointing out the advantages of direct communication by sea between Russia and China by passing Cape Horn at the southern tip of South America and the Cape of Good Hope at the tip of South Africa, he was appointed by Tsar Alexander I to make a voyage to the Far East coast of Asia to endeavour to carry out the project. Under the patronage of Alexander, Count Nikolay Petrovich Rumyantsev and the Russian-American Company, Krusenstern led the first Russian circumnavigation of the world. The chief object of this undertaking was the development of the fur trade with Russian America (Alaska). Other goals of the two-ship expedition were to establish trade with China and Japan, facilitate trade in South America, and examine the coast of California in western North America for a possible colony.

The two ships, Nadezhda ('Hope', formerly the British merchant Leander) under the command of Krusenstern, and Neva (formerly the British merchant Thames) under the command of Captain-Lieutenant Yuri F. Lisianski, set sail from Kronstadt in August 1803, rounded Cape Horn of South America, reached the northern Pacific Ocean, and returned via the Cape of Good Hope at South Africa. Krusenstern arrived back at Kronstadt in August 1806. Both seafarers made maps and detailed recordings of their voyages.

Upon his return, Krusenstern wrote a detailed report, "Reise um die Welt in den Jahren 1803, 1804, 1805 und 1806 auf Befehl Seiner Kaiserlichen Majestät Alexanders des Ersten auf den Schiffen Nadeschda und Newa" ("Journey around the World in the Years 1803, 1804, 1805, and 1806 at the Command of his Imperial Majesty Alexander I in the Ships Nadezhda and Neva") published in Saint Petersburg in 1810. It was published in 1811–1812 in Berlin; this was followed by an English translation, published in London in 1813 and subsequently by French, Dutch, Danish, Swedish, and Italian translations. His scientific work, which includes an atlas of the Pacific, was published in 1827 in Saint Petersburg.

The geographical discoveries of Krusenstern made his voyage very important for the progress of geographical science. His work won him an honorary membership in the Russian Academy of Sciences. He was elected a foreign member of the Royal Swedish Academy of Sciences 1816 and to the American Philosophical Society in 1824.

As director of the Russian naval school Krusenstern did much useful work. He was also a member of the scientific committee of the marine department, and his contrivance for counteracting the influence of the iron in vessels on the compass was adopted in the navy. Krusenstern became an admiral in 1841 and he was awarded the Pour le Mérite (civil class) in 1842. He died in 1846 in Kiltsi manor, an Estonian manor he had purchased in 1816, and was buried in the Tallinn Cathedral.

Legacy 

The Russian training tall ship Kruzenshtern is named after him. To commemorate the 200th anniversary of Krusenstern's circumnavigation, the ship retraced his route around the globe in 2005–2006.

Another ship named after him is the Russian icebreaker . Also, an Aeroflot Airbus 320 VP-BKC  is named after him.

Mount Kruzenshtern, the highest mountain in Novaya Zemlya, as well as crater Krusenstern on the Moon are named after him. There is Krusenstern Island in the Bering Strait, as well as a small group of islands in the Kara Sea, southwest of the Nordenskiöld Archipelago, called Krusenstern Islands. Cape Krusenstern in Northwest Alaska is the site of Cape Krusenstern National Monument (1978), one of the most important archaeological sites in the state.

In Russia (as well as in other Russophone places), a fictional steamship Admiral Ivan Fyodorovich Kruzenshtern from the popular Prostokvashino animated film series is well-known, often as part of a catchphrase "Admiral I.F. Kruzenshtern, a man and a steamship", "pirated" from the title of a requiem poem by Vladimir Mayakovsky, To Comrade Nette, a Man and a Steamship. As a third-level linguistic derivation, there is a Russophone Israel klezmer-rock band, Kruzenshtern & Parohod ("Krusenstern and Steamship").

Another legacy is that the Cook Islands in the South Pacific bear that name thanks to von Krusenstern. Previously known as the Hervey (or Harvey) Islands (or Group), he changed their name in 1835 to honour Captain Cook. More accurately, he changed the name of those which comprised the Southern Group and it was subsequently applied to all 15 islands when the New Zealand Parliament passed "The Cook Islands and other Islands Government Act" in 1901. He recorded the new name in his Atlas de l'Océan Pacifique published at St. Petersburg between 1824 and 1835.

Bibliography

See also 
 Otto von Kotzebue
 Empire of Japan–Russian Empire relations
 European and American voyages of scientific exploration
 List of Baltic German explorers

References

External links 

 Family Krusenstern from Adam Johan von Krusenstern 
 Ilya Vinkovetsky, Circumnavigation, Empire, Modernity, Race: The Impact of Round-the-World Voyages on Russia's Imperial Consciousness "Meeting of Frontiers" Conference, 2001
 Kiltsi manor (in German: Schloss Ass) at Estonian Manors Portal
 Hagudi manor (in German: Haggud) at Estonian Manors Portal
 Biographic entry from Nordisk familjebok (in Swedish)
  Baltic nobility genealogy handbook Adam Johann von Krusenstern's family 

1770 births
1846 deaths
People from Rapla Parish
People from the Governorate of Estonia
Baltic-German people
Estonian explorers
Explorers from the Russian Empire
Imperial Russian Navy admirals
Russian explorers of the Pacific
Russian and Soviet polar explorers
19th-century explorers
Circumnavigators of the globe
Demidov Prize laureates
Members of the Royal Swedish Academy of Sciences
Foreign Members of the Royal Society
Corresponding members of the Saint Petersburg Academy of Sciences
Honorary members of the Saint Petersburg Academy of Sciences
Recipients of the Pour le Mérite (civil class)
Burials at St Mary's Cathedral, Tallinn
18th-century Estonian people
19th-century Estonian people
Founding members of the Russian Geographical Society